Charles Edward Shaw (March 6, 1927 – June 17, 1994) was an American football player. He played at the guard, tackle, and center positions. He played college football for Oklahoma A&M

Early years
A native of Durant, Oklahoma, Shaw attended Classen High School in Oklahoma City.

College and military service
Shaw played college football for the Oklahoma A&M Cowboys from 1946 to 1949. While playing for the Cowboys, he was six feet, two inches, and weighed 215 pounds. He also served in the United States Navy.

Professional football
He then played professional football in the National Football League (NFL) for the San Francisco 49ers during their 1950 season. He appeared in six NFL games, three of them as a starter. He was released by the 49ers on October 21, 1950.

Family and later years
While in college, Shaw married fellow Oklahoma A&M student, Joey Estes. They had a daughter in November 1948. He died in 1994 at age 67.

References

1927 births
1994 deaths
Classen School of Advanced Studies alumni
San Francisco 49ers players
Oklahoma State Cowboys football players
Players of American football from Oklahoma
United States Navy personnel of World War II